Rohan Larkin (born 19 October 1969) is an Australian former cricketer. He played 16 first-class cricket matches for Victoria between 1995 and 1997.

See also
 List of Victoria first-class cricketers

References

External links
 

1969 births
Living people
Australian cricketers
Victoria cricketers
Cricketers from Melbourne